Landywood railway station is situated in the village of Landywood in Staffordshire,
England.  As well as Landywood, the station also serves the adjacent villages of Cheslyn Hay and Great Wyrley (The former Wyrley and Cheslyn Hay railway station closed in the 1960s). The LNWR also operated an earlier halt at Landywood which closed on 1 January 1916.

The station, and all trains serving it, are operated by West Midlands Railway.

History
The first station on the site was opened in 1908 by the London and North Western Railway but closed after a short life in 1916.
The present station opened in 1989, as part of the first stage of the reopening by British Rail of the Chase Line from Walsall to Hednesford to passenger trains.  The area was previously served by a station further north at Great Wyrley, but this was closed during the Beeching Axe of the 1960s.

In 2010, the stations between Walsall and Stafford (including Landywood) were subject to a £1.6 million upgrade project. This included the installation of new lighting, CCTV, live train information boards, and new waiting shelters.

From 2018, Great Wyrley & Cheslyn Hay Community Group will help maintain the station as part of West Midland Railway's station adoption scheme.

In 2019 the Chase Line electrification works were completed and the first electric trains will run from 19 May. This was to coincide with a major timetable change introducing hourly services to London Euston via Birmingham International. London bound trains are run by the London Northwestern franchise.

From May 2020, London services will run at peak times only, with the remainder terminating at Birmingham International or Coventry. This is unfortunately due to timetable issues along the line causing delays and cancellations.

Services
Typically, Monday to Saturday daytimes and peak times, Landywood is served by two trains per hour in each direction between Birmingham New Street and Rugeley Trent Valley where connections to Stafford, Stoke-on-Trent and Crewe are available. On Sundays Landywood is served by 1 train per hour. Services are usually operated by Class 350 electric trains.

Journey times are typically 14 minutes to Walsall and 38 minutes to Birmingham New Street.

A range of onward travel options are available from nearby bus stops including buses to Cheslyn Hay, Cannock, Stafford, Wolverhampton, New Cross Hospital, Essington, Bloxwich, Walsall, Birmingham and the McArthurGlen Designer Outlet in Hawks Green.

Nearby shopping precinct 'Quinton Court' offers a range of shops and eateries, in addition to Great Wyrley Library and Health Center.

References

External links

South Staffordshire District
Railway stations in Staffordshire
DfT Category F2 stations
Former London and North Western Railway stations
Railway stations in Great Britain opened in 1908
Railway stations in Great Britain closed in 1916
Railway stations in Great Britain opened in 1989
Railway stations served by West Midlands Trains
1908 establishments in England
1989 establishments in England